The Coinage Act 1870 (33 & 34 Vict c 10) is an Act of the Parliament of the United Kingdom. It stated the metric weights of British coins. For example, it defined the weight of the sovereign as 7.98805 grams (about 123.27747 grains). The Act was repealed by the Coinage Act 1971. The Act is retained for the Republic of Ireland by section 2 of, and Part 4 of Schedule 1 to, the Statute Law Revision Act 2007.

The Act also vested the titles of Master of the Mint and 'Governor of the Mint of Scotland', which had ceased minting coins in 1707, in the Chancellor of the Exchequer.

The Act also gave the British government the authority to establish branches of the Mint in overseas British possessions.  In 1907, the government used that power to establish a branch of the Mint in Ottawa, at the request of the Canadian government.  It repealed the authorization in 1931, when the Mint in Ottawa came under full Canadian control.

A contemporary history suggests that the Act was influenced by the criticisms of George Frederick Ansell.

See also
Coinage Act

References 
 "Coinage Act, 1870". eISB.

United Kingdom Acts of Parliament 1870
1870 in economics
Currency law in the United Kingdom